Arantxa Sánchez Vicario defeated the defending champion Steffi Graf in the final, 1–6, 7–6(7–3), 6–4 to win the women's singles tennis title at the 1994 US Open. She lost just one set during the tournament, to Graf in the final.

Seeds

Qualifying

Draw

Finals

Top half

Section 1

Section 2

Section 3

Section 4

Bottom half

Section 5

Section 6

Section 7

Section 8

References

External links
1994 US Open – Women's draws and results at the International Tennis Federation

Women's Singles
US Open (tennis) by year – Women's singles
1994 in women's tennis
1994 in American women's sports